The Bell 400 TwinRanger was a prototype four-bladed, twin-engine civil helicopter developed by Bell Helicopter in the 1980s. Both the TwinRanger and another planned version, the Bell 440, were attempts to market a twin-engine development of the Model 206L LongRanger. The Bell 400A was a planned single-engine version of the 400. TwinRanger, however development was canceled when Bell could not acquire enough orders for production. The TwinRanger name was later used for a twin-engine version of the LongRanger produced from 1994 to 1997.

Development
Bell has tried several incarnations of a twin-engine version of its successful Bell 206 series. The TwinRanger name dates back to the mid-1980s when Bell first considered developing a twin-engine version of the LongRanger.

The Bell 400 TwinRanger featured a reprofiled fuselage, two Allison 250 turboshafts, the OH-58D Kiowa's four-bladed main rotor, and a new shrouded tail rotor. Bell also planned the single-engine 400A, and the 440 twin with a larger fuselage made possible by a high degree of composites. The Bell 400 first flew on April 4, 1984. Bell suspended development of the 400/440 family in the late 1980s as it felt unable to achieve a profitable production rate of 120 units a year.

Successors
After the success of Tridair's Gemini ST twin-engine conversions of the 206L in the early 1990s, Bell produced the equivalent Bell 206LT TwinRanger based on the 206L-4. Only 13 206LTs were built between 1994 and 1997. The 206LT was replaced in Bell's lineup by the Bell 427, a mostly-new development of the Bell 407, itself a four-bladed single-engine derivative of the 206L.

Variants
Bell 400  
Bell 440

Specifications (Bell 400)

See also

References

External links
 Official Bell Helicopter website

1980s United States helicopters
1980s United States civil utility aircraft
Twin-turbine helicopters
Aircraft first flown in 1984
400 TwinRanger

de:Bell 429